is a single by Japanese music duo The Peanuts. Written by Tokiko Iwatani and Hiroshi Miyagawa, the single was released on February 10, 1962, by King Records. The song was written in the style of American pop music at the time. It stood out in the Japanese music scene, as it was an original composition in contrast to the "cover pops" that were translations of western pop songs. In addition, it was one of the earliest Japanese songs recorded in stereo. The Peanuts performed the song on the 13th Kōhaku Uta Gassen.

"Furimukanaide" was featured in the film , which also starred the Peanuts. It was also used in the 2009 anime film Evangelion: 2.0 You Can (Not) Advance, as well as the 2015 Fuji TV drama series .

Track listing

Wink version 

"Furimukanaide" was covered by the idol duo Wink as their 15th single, released on July 22, 1992, by Polystar Records. This version was used as the ending theme of the Fuji TV quiz show Naruhodo! The World. The B-side, "Romance no Hakobune", is a Japanese-language cover of Italian singer Mr. Zivago's "Little Russian".

This version peaked at No. 7 on the Oricon's weekly charts and sold over 132,000 copies.

Track listing

Chart positions 
Weekly charts

Year-end charts

Other cover versions 
 Candies covered the song on their 1977 album Candy Label.
 Juicy Fruits covered the song on their 1981 album Pajama Date.
 Harumi Inoue covered the song in 1991.
 The Nolans covered the song in English as "Please Don't" on their 1992 cover album Please Don't.
 Yasuko Matsuyuki covered the song in 1997.
 W covered the song as the B-side of their 2003 single "Koi no Fuga".
 Russian duo Arahis covered the song in 2006.
 The Lilies covered the song on their 2014 cover album The Lilies Sing the Peanuts.
 Sasa Handa covered the song on her 2015 album Double S.
 Manaka and Asahi of Little Glee Monster covered the song on the 2016 various artists album The Peanuts Tribute Songs.

References

External links 
The Peanuts version
 

Wink version
 
 

1962 singles
1992 singles
1962 songs
Wink (duo) songs
Japanese-language songs
King Records (Japan) singles

fr:Furimukanaide (chanson de Wink)
ja:ふりむかないで (ザ・ピーナッツの曲)